Aye is a village of Wallonia and a district of the municipality of Marche-en-Famenne, located in the province of Luxembourg, Belgium.

The inhabitants of Aye are called the "Godis" in the Walloon language.

Postal Code
The postal code is 6900.

Nearest Airport
The nearest airport is at Liege, about 46 km away.

Geology
It gives its name to a geologic formation.

Accommodation 
The main accommodation is Château D'Assonville, an impressive castle hotel with 20 rooms, situated in a private park. 

The hotel has a restaurant called Le Grand Pavillon.

External links 
 Aye, My Village

Former municipalities of Luxembourg (Belgium)
Marche-en-Famenne